Ranbir Singh Pora is a town and nagar panchayat, near city of Jammu in Jammu district of the Indian Union territory of Jammu and Kashmir. It was the first planned city of J&K, that's why it is also known as Nawa Shehar. RS Pura is also one of the major producers of World's Famous Basmati Rice.

History
R. S. Pura is named after the great Dogra ruler Maharaja Ranbir Singh, successor of Maharaja Gulab Singh, founder of the Jammu and Kashmir state. Before independence, this area was regularly visited by the Jaddi people of Dalowali who used to carry sugarcane to Nawanshehar (R. S. Pura) Sugar Mills. Before 1947 there was a big sugar mill in RS Pura. The city was made by Maharaja Ranbir Singh under the supervision of Diwan Jawala sahai in the 1800s .Earlier there was very wild open area, later developed as a model town. It was first planned town in the state with streets, pond, elephant training centre, big temple named Diwana mandir along with big garden. Diwan's office was where now is tehsildar's office is situated.

Prior to 1947 the state was linked with rest of the Country through rail via R.S. Pura only. There existed an old station in the city, which had train services to Sialkot junction, now in Pakistan. The Station was also linked with Wazirabad and Narowal (both in Pakistan). This Station was built in around 1867. Train's station was at RS Pura, Miran Sahib, and Bikram Chowk (where the station was known as Jammu (Tawi). The train halted for the last time at this station in 1947 which was loaded with refugees from Pakistan and they settled over there near rail line deriving the name Patri. This rail route in the state became defunct after 1947 but Sialkot rail line was further developed and is now used by Pakistan.

Politics
 
Sardar Darshan Singh Azad,1940-2021 Former Provincial Vice President and chairman of Department of judiciary and Panchayat (2011-2020). Sardar Darshan Singh was a famous personality of Jammu and Kashmir state. Sardar Darshan Singh Was born to Sardar Daya Singh and Grandson of Sardar Maya Singh Maniani of Maniani Dynasty. He was retired from state civil services as a Government headmaster in year 1982. In 1982 he was elected as district Vice President of Jammu, he was also elected as President of DGPC Jammu in year 1983. Through his support and help in 1987 Babu parmanand won as MLA from Bishnah constituency. In year 1987 Mr. Singh contested as member of legislative council (MLC). Again in year 1996 he was contested as (MLC). In year 1996 and 2004 he supported Pt. Mangat ram sharma (Former deputy Chief minister of j&k) in parliament elections. In year 2016 Mr. Darshan Singh Azad was nominated as provincial Vice President of JKNC by Dr. Farooq Abdullaha and others.
 Bhagat Chajju Ram Bhagat, was the member of J&K Constituent assembly, 1951 and represented Rs Pura constituency in it. He is called GANDHI OF J&K.He was the cabinet minister for approximately 40 years and represented RS PURA constituency four times . He was also elected to the Praja Sabha of Maharaja Hari Singh.
 Naib Subedar Bana Singh P.V.C., who was awarded the Param Vir Chakra, the highest wartime gallantry medal.

Geography 
It has an average elevation of 270 metres (886 feet above sea level). The daily mean temperature in this region is ~6 °C in winter and ~44 °C in summer.

It is nearly 24.5 km towards south from district headquarter Jammu and about 320 km from state capital Srinagar. It is mainly connected though road with the main city. This area has up to date bus service. R.S. Pura is approx. 22 km away from Jammu Tawi Railway Station and nearly 15 km away from the airport. It is located on the Indo-Pak border Suchetgarh which is 33 km away from the district headquarters of Jammu.

It is a major Tehsil having 194 villages as per 2011 census. Main languages spoken by the people of this area are Punjabi, Dogri, Hindi and Urdu. The main road linking R.S Pura was once the bus route from Jammu to Sialkot (Pakistan) and this route was so popular that there were several inns built on the route by the Maharaja of Jammu and Kashmir.

Suchetgarh (Indo-Pak border) is nearly 35 km from Jammu City and 10.3 km from R.S Pura. This post was set up after first war over Kashmir in 1947-48. Prior to independence there used to be an Octroi post for collection of taxes at Suchatgarh. Now it is used as a Border Security Post. Near the vicinity of this post there lie a Prehistoric and Raghunath temple which have their own importance. Within the temple complex there is an old Sarai which was used as a halting place for travelers.

This area has not only historical importance as quoted above but is a land of warriors and heroes like NaibSubedarBana Singh recipient of Paramveer Chakra who recaptured the Qaid-e-Aazam post from Pakistan intruders and is now being named as Bana Post. The atmosphere of R.S. Pura is filled with courage and patriotism. Most of the boys of this area has utmost zeal to serve their nation by joining army. Number of soldiers exhibited their bravery in the Kargil war in 1999 such as Lance Naik Devinder Singh and SepoyJanvir Singh.

Economy
The main economic activities of Ranbir Singh Pura are agriculture and dairy farming. Rice (basmati) and wheat are major crops, and berseen and vegetables are also grown. The Rakh area of Badyal Brahmana and Arnia are known for vegetable farming. Ranbir Singh Pura has many rice mills for the processing of high-quality Basmati rice. Fame of Ranbir Singh Pora nowadays is connected with its basmati rice, known for its quality and unique aroma. It is believed that this unique aroma is due to the water of Chenab which is used to irrigate the agricultural lands in almost every part of R.S Pura through Ranbir Canal System.

The main tourist destination is Gharana Wetland, where migratory birds from temperate zones of Asia come to enjoy the landscape. Suchetgarh BSF Post is also a tourist attraction and an alternative for Wagah Border and is attracting many tourists nowadays.

The main town is self-sufficient, containing department stores, garment showrooms, sweets and confectionery, and a fresh fruit and vegetable open market. Town has also one of the best Paints and Sanitaryware market with all the famous brands like Berger Paints, Indigo Paints & Hindware etc. All of these brands are available at Rashtrya Iron Store, near bus-stand,RS Pura. Apart from these, healthcare services, a post office, nationalized banks (JKB, SBI, PNB, PSB), and private sector banks like HDFC, ICICI are present. State Bank of Patiala, another nationalized bank, opened its branch in 2013.

Education

The major educational institutions of Ranbir Singh Pura are SKUAST-Veterinary College, Govt. Degree College, and Govt. Higher Sec School. The city also possesses many centers of primary and secondary education. There are famous private schools like New Model Public School, Holy cross convent high school, DAV, Montessori and many more schools which are empowering the future of local kids.

Demographics 
At the time of the 2011 India census, Ranbir Singh Pura had a population of 163567. Males constitute 54% of the population and females 46%. Ranbir Singh Pura has an average literacy rate of 70%, higher than the national average of 59.5%: male literacy is 77%, and female literacy is 63%. In Ranbir Singh Pura, 11% of the population is under 6 years of age.

Religion
The religious data for the RS Pura, Notified Committee Municipal Limits is Hindu 90.52%, Sikh 5.97%, Muslim 1.70%, Christians 1.69%

Transport
The town once had a train station on the Jammu-Sialkot Line. Currently, bus services are available for reaching to Jammu City.

References

Cities and towns in Jammu district